The Heidelberg Catechism (1563), one of the Three Forms of Unity, is a Protestant confessional document taking the form of a series of questions and answers, for use in teaching Calvinist Christian doctrine. It was published in 1563 in Heidelberg, Germany. Its original title translates to Catechism, or Christian Instruction, according to the Usages of the Churches and Schools of the Electoral Palatinate. Commissioned by the prince-elector of the Electoral Palatinate, it is sometimes referred to as the "Palatinate Catechism." It has been translated into many languages and is regarded as one of the most influential of the Reformed catechisms.

History 
Elector Frederick III, sovereign of the Electoral Palatinate from 1559 to 1576, commissioned the composition of a new Catechism for his territory. While the catechism's introduction credits the "entire theological faculty here" (at the University of Heidelberg) and "all the superintendents and prominent servants of the church" for the composition of the catechism, Zacharius Ursinus (1534–83) is commonly regarded as the catechism's principal author. Caspar Olevianus (1536–87) was formerly asserted as a co-author of the document, though this theory has been largely discarded by modern scholarship. Johann Sylvan, Adam Neuser, Johannes Willing, Thomas Erastus, Michael Diller, Johannes Brunner, Tilemann Mumius, Petrus Macheropoeus, Johannes Eisenmenger, Immanuel Tremellius and Pierre Boquin are all likely to have contributed to the Catechism in some way. Frederick himself wrote the preface to the Catechism and closely oversaw its composition and publication.

Frederick, who was officially Lutheran but had strong Calvinist leanings, wanted to even out the religious situation of his highly Lutheran territory within the primarily Catholic Holy Roman Empire. The Council of Trent had just finished its work with its conclusions and decrees against the Protestant faiths, and the Peace of Augsburg had only granted toleration for Lutheranism within the empire where the ruler was Lutheran. One of the aims of the catechism was to counteract the teachings of the Catholic Church as well as Anabaptists and "strict" Gnesio-Lutherans like Tilemann Heshusius (recently elevated to general superintendent of the university) and Matthias Flacius, who were resisting Frederick's Reformed influences, particularly on the matter of the Eucharist.

The Catechism based each of its statements on Biblical source texts (although some may call them "proof-texts" which can have a negative connotation), but the "strict" Lutherans continued to attack it, the assault being still led by Heshusius and Flacius. Frederick himself defended it at the 1566 Diet of Augsburg as based in scripture rather than based in Calvinism when he was called to answer to charges, brought by Maximilian II, of violating the Peace of Augsburg. Afterwards, the catechism quickly became widely accepted.

The Catechism is divided into fifty-two sections, called "Lord's Days," which were designed to be taught on each of the 52 Sundays of the year. A synod in Heidelberg approved the catechism in 1563. In the Netherlands, the Catechism was approved by the Synods of Wesel (1568), Emden (1571), Dort (1578), the Hague (1586), as well as the great Synod of Dort of 1618–19, which adopted it as one of the Three Forms of Unity, together with the Belgic Confession and the Canons of Dort.  Elders and deacons were required to subscribe and adhere to it, and ministers were required to preach on a section of the Catechism each Sunday so as to increase the often poor theological knowledge of the church members. In many Reformed denominations originating from the Netherlands, this practice is still continued.

Structure 
In its current form, the Heidelberg Catechism consists of 129 questions and answers. These are divided into three main parts:

I. The Misery of Man 

This part consists of the Lord's Day 2, 3, and 4.  It discusses:
 The Fall,
 The natural condition of man,
 God's demands on him in His law.

II. The Redemption (or Deliverance) of Man 

This part consists of Lord's Day 5 through to Lord's Day 31.  It discusses:
 The need for a Redeemer
 The importance of faith, the content of which is explained by an exposition of the 12 Articles of the Christian faith, known as the Apostles' Creed. The discussion of these articles is further divided into sections on:
 God the Father and our creation (Lord's Days 9–10)
 God the Son and our salvation (Lord's Days 11–19)
 God the Holy Spirit and our sanctification (Lord's Days 20–22)
 Justification
 The Sacraments of Baptism and the Lord's Supper
 And the keys of the kingdom of heaven The Preaching of the Gospel and Church Discipline

III. The Gratitude Due from Man (for such a deliverance) 

This part consists of the Lord's Day 32 through to Lord's Day 52.  It discusses:
 Conversion (Lord's Days 32–33)
 The Ten Commandments (Lord's Days 34–44)
 The Lord's prayer (Lord's Days 45–52)

Lord's Day 1 
The first Lord's Day should be read as a summary of the catechism as a whole. As such, it illustrates the character of this work, which is devotional as well as dogmatic or doctrinal. The first Question and Answer reads:

The answer is:

Lord's Day 30 
The Catechism is most notoriously and explicitly anti-Catholic in the additions made in its second and third editions to Lord's Day 30 concerning "the popish mass," which is condemned as an "accursed idolatry."

Following the War of Palatine Succession Heidelberg and the Palatinate were again in an unstable political situation with sectarian battle lines.  In 1719 an edition of the Catechism was published in the Palatinate that included Lord's Day 30. The Catholic reaction was so strong, the Catechism was banned by Charles III Philip, Elector Palatine. This provoked a reaction from Reformed countries, leading to a reversal of the ban.

In some Reformed denominations Q&A 80, the first of Lord's Day 30, have been removed, bracketed, and/or noted as not part of the original Catechism.

Use in various denominations and traditions 

The influence of the Catechism extended to the Westminster Assembly of Divines who, in part, used it as the basis for their Shorter Catechism.

The Heidelberg Catechism is one of the three Reformed confessions that form the doctrinal basis of the original Reformed church in The Netherlands, and is recognized as such also by the Dutch Calvinist churches that originated from that church during and since the 19th century.

Several Protestant denominations in North America presently honor the Catechism officially: the Presbyterian Church in America, ECO (A Covenant Order of Evangelical Presbyterians), the Christian Reformed Church, the United Reformed Churches, the Presbyterian Church (USA), the Reformed Church in America, the Communion of Reformed Evangelical Churches, the United Church of Christ (a successor to the German Reformed churches), the Reformed Church in the United States (also of German Reformed heritage),the Evangelical Association of Reformed and Congregational Christian Churches,  the Free Reformed Churches of North America, the Heritage Reformed Congregations, the Canadian and American Reformed Churches, Protestant Reformed Churches, the Reformed Protestant Churches, and several other Calvinist churches of Dutch origin around the world. Likewise, the Book of Discipline of The United Methodist Church lists it as an influence on United Methodism.

A revision of the catechism was prepared by the Baptist minister, Hercules Collins. Published in 1680, under the title 'An Orthodox Catechism', it was identical in content to the Heidelberg catechism, with exception to questions regarding baptism, where adult immersion was defended against infant baptism and the other modes of affusion and aspersion.

See also 

 Catechism

References

Further reading

External links
Heidelberg Catechism (modern English translation): From the Reformed Church in the United States
Heidelberg Curriculum for Families (text and audio)
Audio Recording of the Heidelberg Catechism (mp3)
Heidelberg-Catechism.com

1563 books
Dutch Reformed Church
Three Forms of Unity
Catechisms
History of Heidelberg
1563 in Christianity
Protestant education
16th-century Christian texts